Stigmella amelanchierella is a moth of the family Nepticulidae. This species was described by James Brackenridge Clemens in 1862 from mines on Amelanchier species found in June and July. This original (type) material was not preserved and there are no known bred specimens.

Vacated mines have been collected in Ohio, Kentucky and North Carolina in the United States. These mines were described as long, linear and transparent. The frass is deposited in a rather broad line through the middle. The cocoon is pale brownish ocherous.

There is no reference to the formation of a blotch, which the two other species known from Amelanchier produce (Stigmella taeniola and Ectoedemia nyssaefoliella).

Unfortunately, there is not enough evidence to know if this species should be placed in Stigmella or Ectoedemia.

External links
Newton, Philip J. & Wilkinson, Christopher (October 1982) "A taxonomic revision of the North American species of Stigmella (Lepidoptera: Nepticulidae)". Systematic Entomology. 7(4) pp. 367–463 .

Nepticulidae
Moths of North America
Moths described in 1862